Tazeh Kand-e Deym (also Romanized as Tāzeh Kand-e Deym) is a Kurdish village in Hasanlu Rural District, Mohammadyar District, Naqadeh County, West Azerbaijan Province, Iran. At the 2006 census, its population was 40, in 13 families.

References 

Populated places in Naqadeh County